Dasyueshan National Forest Recreation Area is a forest located in Heping District, Taichung, Taiwan.

Geology
The forest spans over an area of 3,963 hectares and is located at an altitude of 1,000-2,996 meters above sea level. The mountains and recreational areas of the forest are located at an altitude of 2,000 meters. The mean temperature during summer is 18°C and during winter is -5°C.

Tourism
The forest attracts 200,000 visitors every year.

See also
 Geography of Taiwan

References

Geography of Taichung
National forest recreation areas in Taiwan
Tourist attractions in Taichung